Charles Andrew Russell (born October 29, 1941) is an American former professional football player who spent his entire 12-year career as a linebacker for the Pittsburgh Steelers of the National Football League (NFL). He played college football for the Missouri Tigers, and earned a degree in economics from the University of Missouri.

As a freshman in high school, he moved from the New York area to St. Louis, attending Ladue High School. He graduated from Ladue Horton Watkins High School in 1959. Having never played football in the East, he became a starter as a sophomore, playing end. In his junior and senior year, he played fullback and linebacker, earning all-state honors in his senior year.  Heavily recruited by out-state universities, he selected Missouri and began a tradition of St. Louis area football players attending their home-state university under Coach Dan Devine.

After playing for the Steelers his rookie season in 1963 and just missing out on playing the Chicago Bears for the NFL Championship, Russell temporarily left the team for the Army to fulfill ROTC commitments from Missouri. He then returned to the Steelers in 1966, where he would spend the next 11 seasons.

He was an early member of Pittsburgh's famed Steel Curtain defense, and was named the Steelers' MVP in 1971.  He made seven Pro Bowl appearances—in 1969 and from 1971 through 1976—and earned two Super Bowl rings in Super Bowl IX and Super Bowl X. On December 27, 1975, he set the NFL playoff record for a returned touchdown–93 yards in a Three Rivers Stadium victory over the Baltimore Colts. Some have claimed it as the longest football play from scrimmage in time duration. In 2011, the Professional Football Researchers Association named Russell to the PFRA Hall of Very Good Class of 2011

References

External links
 
  Andy Russell statistics at databasefootball.com

1941 births
Living people
American football linebackers
Ladue Horton Watkins High School alumni
Missouri Tigers football players
Pittsburgh Steelers players
American Conference Pro Bowl players
Eastern Conference Pro Bowl players
Players of American football from Detroit
Players of American football from St. Louis
National Football League announcers
United States Army officers